Jorge Costa (born 20 March 1961) is a Portuguese race walker.

Achievements

References

1961 births
Living people
Portuguese male racewalkers
Athletes (track and field) at the 2004 Summer Olympics
Olympic athletes of Portugal